Robert McMaster Schaefer (April 19, 1930 – February 27, 2022) was an American politician and lawyer.

Schaefer born in Seattle, Washington. He grew up in Vancouver, Washington and graduated from Vancouver High School in 1948. Schaefer went to Clark College and received his bachelor's and law degrees from Willamette University. He was admitted to the Washington bar and then served in the United States Army. Schaefer then returned to Clark County, Washington and practiced law in Vancouver. He served in the Washington House of Representatives from 1959 to 1967 and was a Democrat. He was Speaker of the House from 1965 to 1967.

References

1930 births
2022 deaths
Lawyers from Seattle
Politicians from Seattle
Military personnel from Seattle
Politicians from Vancouver, Washington
Clark College alumni
Willamette University alumni
Democratic Party members of the Washington House of Representatives